Face Tat (stylized in all caps) is the second full-length studio album by American recording artist Zach Hill. It was released on October 19, 2010.

Reception

Face Tat received positive reviews from critics upon release. On Metacritic, the album holds a score of 74/100 based on 13 reviews, indicating "generally favorable reviews".

Track listing

References

2010 albums
Zach Hill albums
Sargent House albums